Wolfgang Pree (* 27 June 1964 in Linz, Austria) is a computer scientist and professor at the University of Salzburg, Austria.

Education and academic work
Wolfgang Pree is a Full Professor of Computer Science at the University of Salzburg, Austria since 2002. He studied computer science at the Johannes Kepler University of Linz, was a Visiting Assistant Professor at Washington University in St Louis (1992–93), a guest scientist at Siemens Munich (1994–95), a Full Professor of Computer Science (C4) at the University of Konstanz, Germany (1996–2001), and spent sabbaticals at the University of California, Berkeley and the University of California, San Diego.

His field of research is software engineering, especially software construction principles, and machine learning. His C. Doppler Laboratory Embedded Software Systems (2007–2014) in cooperation with AVL List focused on real-time software in automobiles and automation systems. The research results are further developed into products by Chrona and are deployed in Daimler's next generation of electric vehicles since 2019/20.

Pioneering work has been done in the field of autonomously driving trains on open tracks since 2008: the Austrian Klima- und Energie-Fonds supported the autoBAHN project, so that a pilot system could be implemented on the Stern&Hafferl line between Vorchdorf and Gmunden in 2008–2013.

Wolfgang Pree initiated Go4IT in 2017 (start of a bachelor's degree in computer science at high school): high school students can attend introductory courses in computer science at the University of Salzburg from 9th grade onwards.

References

External links
Software Research Group, Univ. Salzburg, including publications
Chrona.com, a spin-off company founded by Wolfgang Pree

Academic staff of the University of Salzburg
Austrian computer scientists
1964 births
Living people
Johannes Kepler University Linz alumni
Washington University in St. Louis alumni
Academic staff of the University of Konstanz